Alan Charles Olle (23 July 1924 – 12 October 2004) was an Australian rules footballer who played for  in the Victorian Football League (VFL).

Early life
Olle was born in Melbourne in 1924.

In 1942 he enlisted in the Royal Australian Air Force (RAAF), serving as a sergeant until he was discharged in 1946.

Football career
He made his debut in the final round of the 1946 VFL season against  at the Junction Oval. Between 1946 and 1951 he played 51 matches for the Saints.

In 1952 Olle accepted a coaching role in Sorrento when the Coulter Law restricted payments to VFL players to £3 per week, £7 less than Sorrento's offer. His employer, the Postmaster-General's Department (PMG) obliged with a transfer to Sorrento's telephone exchange. Only a year passed before Sorrento was celebrating its first premiership in 18 years, defeating Frankston by 3 points 12-6-78 to 11-9-75 in a thriller. Olle and president Jim Thoms (ex-Footscray) were instrumental in attracting numerous talented VFL/VFA players to the club to mount the 1953 premiership assault including Mike Fitchett (Hawthorn), Dick Kennedy (Melbourne and Fitzroy), Alby Morrison (Footscray), Fred Stafford (1947 Carlton premiers), Ron Wilson (St.Kilda) and Norm Spencer (Brunswick).

Olle had a record-breaking 3-stint association with Sorrento over nine seasons, the first and second as playing coach (1952-1956 and 1959–1961) the third and final as non-playing coach (1982).

References

1924 births
2004 deaths
St Kilda Football Club players
Australian rules footballers from Melbourne
Royal Australian Air Force personnel of World War II
Royal Australian Air Force airmen
Military personnel from Melbourne
Australian rules football coaches